Wheatley Alternative Education Center  is a secondary alternative school located in Temple, Texas, in the Temple Independent School District. The school serves all of TISD, including the city of Temple and Bell County. In 2015, the school remained unrated by the Texas Education Agency.

Wheatley Alternative Education Center is an alternative school and does not have school team sports; however, it does offer physical education, also known as PE.

References

External links
Official Website

Schools in Bell County, Texas
Public high schools in Texas
Alternative schools in the United States